Franz Berry (21 November 1938 – 6 July 2009) was a Swiss ice hockey player who played for the Switzerland men's national ice hockey team at the 1956 and 1964 Olympics. He was born in Davos, Switzerland.

External links

1938 births
2009 deaths
Ice hockey players at the 1956 Winter Olympics
Ice hockey players at the 1964 Winter Olympics
Lausanne HC players
Olympic ice hockey players of Switzerland
People from Davos
Sportspeople from Graubünden
Swiss ice hockey forwards